In differential geometry, a hyperkähler manifold is a Riemannian manifold  endowed with three integrable almost complex structures  that are Kähler with respect to the Riemannian metric  and satisfy the quaternionic relations . In particular, it is a hypercomplex manifold. All hyperkähler manifolds are Ricci-flat and are thus Calabi–Yau manifolds.

Hyperkähler manifolds were defined by Eugenio Calabi in 1979.

Equivalent definition in terms of holonomy

Equivalently, a hyperkähler manifold is a Riemannian manifold  of dimension  whose holonomy group is contained in the compact symplectic group .

Parallel transport of these complex structures gives the required complex structures  on  making  into a hyperkähler manifold.

Two-sphere of complex structures
Every hyperkähler manifold  has a 2-sphere of complex structures with respect to which the metric  is Kähler. Indeed, for any real numbers  such that

the linear combination

Holomorphic symplectic form
A hyperkähler manifold , considered as a complex manifold , is holomorphically symplectic (equipped with a holomorphic, non-degenerate, closed 2-form).

Conversely, Shing-Tung Yau's proof of the Calabi conjecture implies that a compact, Kähler, holomorphically symplectic manifold  is always equipped with a compatible hyperkähler metric. Such a metric is unique in a given Kähler class. Compact hyperkähler manifolds have been extensively studied using techniques from algebraic geometry, sometimes under the name holomorphically symplectic manifolds. This fact immediately follows from the Bochner formula for holomorphic forms on a Kähler manifold, together the Berger classification of holonomy groups; ironically, it is often attributed to Bogomolov, who incorrectly went on to claim in the same paper that compact hyperkähler manifolds actually do not exist!

Examples
For any integer , the space  of -tuples of quaternions endowed with the flat Euclidean metric is a hyperkähler manifold. The first non-trivial example discovered is the Eguchi–Hanson metric on the cotangent bundle  of the two-sphere. It was also independently discovered by Eugenio Calabi, who showed the more general statement that cotangent bundle  of any complex projective space has a complete hyperkähler metric. More generally, Birte Feix and Dmitry Kaledin showed that the cotangent bundle of any Kähler manifold has a hyperkähler structure on a neighbourhood of its zero section, although it is generally incomplete.

Due to Kunihiko Kodaira's classification of complex surfaces, we know that any compact hyperkähler 4-manifold is either a K3 surface or a compact torus .

As was discovered by Beauville, the Hilbert scheme of  points on a compact hyperkähler 4-manifold is a hyperkähler manifold of dimension .  This gives rise to two series of compact examples: Hilbert schemes of points on a K3 surface and generalized Kummer varieties.

These spaces, and various generalizations involving different asymptotic behaviors, are studied in physics under the name gravitational instantons. The Gibbons–Hawking ansatz gives examples invariant under a circle action.

Many examples of noncompact hyperkähler manifolds arise as moduli spaces of solutions to certain gauge theory equations which arise from the dimensional reduction of the anti-self dual Yang–Mills equations: instanton moduli spaces, monopole moduli spaces, spaces of solutions to Nigel Hitchin's self-duality equations on Riemann surfaces, space of solutions to Nahm equations. Another class of examples are the Nakajima quiver varieties, which are of great importance in representation theory.

Cohomology
 show that the cohomology of any compact hyperkähler manifold embeds into the cohomology of a torus, in a way that preserves the Hodge structure.

Notes

See also
Quaternion-Kähler manifold
Hypercomplex manifold
Quaternionic manifold
Calabi–Yau manifold
Gravitational instanton
Hyperkähler quotient
Twistor theory

References

 
 Kieran G. O’Grady, (2011) "Higher-dimensional analogues of K3 surfaces." MR2931873
 
 

Structures on manifolds
Complex manifolds
Riemannian manifolds
Differential geometry
Quaternions